Waimea is a common place name in Hawaii and New Zealand. In Hawaiian, it means reddish water; in Māori it means forgotten or hidden stream. It may refer to:

Places

Hawaii, United States
Waimea, Hawaii County, Hawaii, (Big Island, post office "Kamuela")
Waimea-Kohala Airport, Hawaii County
Waimea, Kauai County, Hawaii
Waimea Bay, Oahu
Waimea Canyon State Park, Kauai
Waimea Ditch, Kauai
Waimea River (Kauai)
Waimea River (Oahu)
Waimea Valley, Oahu

New Zealand
Waimea Inlet, Tasman Bay
Waimea Plain (Southland)
Waimea Plains (Tasman)
Waimea (New Zealand electorate), historic electorate
Waimea-Picton, historic electorate
Waimea-Sounds (New Zealand electorate), historic electorate
Waimea River (Southland)
Waimea River (Tasman)

Schools
Waimea College, Richmond, Tasman, New Zealand
Waimea High School, Kauai, Hawaii
Waimea Intermediate, Richmond, Tasman, New Zealand

Flora and fauna
Perrottetia sandwicensis (common name Waimea or Olomea), a shrub in the genus Perrottetia native to Hawaii
Waimea pipturus, a Hawaiian flowering nettle
Waimea phyllostegia, a Hawaiian species of mint

Other
Archdeacon of Waimea, an ecclesiastical post in New Zealand
Waimea House, a historic residence in Woollahra, New South Wales, Australia
Waimea Plains Railway, Southland, New Zealand